Allium scilloides, called the fragile onion, is a plant species endemic to the US State of Washington. It has been reported from only 4 counties, all on the eastern side of the Cascade Range: Klickitat, Kittitas, Yakima and Grant. It grows on barren, gravelly slopes at elevations of 300–1300 m. The species is sometimes cultivated in other regions as an ornamental.

Allium scilloides produces bulbs along an underground rhizome, each bulb round to egg-shaped, up to 2 cm across. Flowers are bell-shaped, about 7 mm across; tepals white, pink or purplish with green midribs; anthers purple; pollen white to gray.

References

scilloides
Endemic flora of Washington (state)
Onions
Plants described in 1879
Taxa named by Sereno Watson